The Saint Kilda Handball Club is a handball team from St Kilda, Australia. They are two times Men's National Runner-up's.

Records

Men
 Oceania Handball Champions Cup
Runner-up - 2014, 2015
3rd Place - 2016, 2017

 Australian Handball Club Championship
Runner-up - 2014, 2015
3rd Place - 2016, 2017

 Handball League Australia - 1 title
Winners - 2017
3rd Place - 2016

 Victorian Handball League - 2 titles
Winners - 2017, 2016

References

External links
Official webpage

Handball League Australia
Sporting clubs in Melbourne
Australian handball clubs
2012 establishments in Australia
Handball clubs established in 2012
St Kilda, Victoria
Sport in the City of Port Phillip